Barngarla, formerly known as Parnkalla, is an Aboriginal language of Eyre Peninsula, South Australia, Australia. The last native speaker of the language died in 1964. However, the language has been revived due to work of a German Lutheran pastor Clamor Wilhelm Schurmann who worked at a mission in 1844 and recorded 3,500 words to form a Barngarla dictionary. 

"In 2011 an Israeli linguist, working with Adelaide University and the chair of linguistics and endangered languages, Professor Ghil'ad Zuckermann, contacted the Barngarla community about helping to revive and reclaim the Barngarla language. This request was eagerly accepted by the Barngarla people and language reclamation workshops began in Port Lincoln, Whyalla and Port Augusta in 2012" (Barngarla man Stephen Atkinson, 2013). The reclamation is based on 170-year-old documents.

In October 2016 a mobile app featuring a dictionary of over 3000 Barngarla words was publicly released.

Orthography 
Barngarla is written phonetically using an alphabet of 25 letters, consisting of both single characters and digraphs from the English alphabet.

Despite being considered letters of Barngarla, "ai", "aw", and "ii" do not denote distinct phonemes. On the contrary, they are in fact nothing more than the sum of their parts. The sound of "ai" is literally just the sound of "a" followed by the sound of "i"; similarly with "aw" and "ii". 

One important thing to note is that when there is a sequence of two dental phonemes ("dh", "nh"), the "h" is only written once rather than twice. That is, the sequence /d̟n̟/ is written "dnh" and not "dhnh". Similarly with palatal phonemes ("dy", "ny", "ly") with the "y", ("dny" instead of "dyny"), and with retroflex phonemes ("rd", "rl", "rn") with the "r", ("rdn" instead of "rdrn").

Phonology

Consonants 
Barngarla has the following consonant phonemes: 

The phonemes /d̟/ and /n̟/ are interdental, they are pronounced with the tongue in between the teeth. The phoneme /ɾ~r/ is usually realised as [ɾ], but it is realised as [r] in careful speech or for emphasis. The plosive /ɟ/ is usually realised as an affricate [] or as a plosive with approximant release [] when followed by a vowel.

Vowels 
Barngarla has the following vowel phonemes:

Stress 
The stress always falls on the first syllable of each word.

Grammatical features

Grammatical number 
Barngarla has four grammatical numbers: singular, dual, plural and superplural. For example:
wárraidya "emu" (singular)
wárraidyalbili "two emus" (dual)
wárraidyarri "emus" (plural)
wárraidyailyarranha "a lot of emus", "heaps of emus" (superplural)

Matrilineal and patrilineal distinction 
Barngarla is characterized by a matrilineal and patrilineal distinction. For example, the matrilineal ergative case first person dual pronoun ngadlaga ("we two") would be used by a mother and her child, or by a man and his sister’s child, while the patrilineal form ngarrrinyi would be used by a father and his child, or by a woman with her brother’s child.

Naming children according to their birth order 
In traditional Barngarla, birth order was so important that each child within the family was named according to the order in which s/he was born. Barngarla has nine male birth order names and nine female birth order names, as following:

Male: Biri (1st), Warri (2nd), Gooni (3rd), Mooni (4th), Mari (5th), Yari (6th), Mili (7th), Wanggooyoo (8th) and Ngalai (9th). 
Female: Gardanya (1st), Wayooroo (2nd), Goonda (3rd), Moonaga (4th), Maroogoo (5th), Yaranda (6th), Milaga (7th), Wanggoordoo (8th) and Ngalaga (9th).

To determine the suitable name for the newborn Barngarla child, the parents first found out the number of the newborn within the family, and only then selected the male/female name, according to the gender of the newborn. So, for example, if a baby girl was born after three boys, her name would have been Moonaga (4th born, female) as she was the fourth child within the family.

Language resources 
Zuckermann, Ghil'ad and the Barngarla (2019), Barngarlidhi Manoo (Speaking Barngarla Together), Barngarla Language Advisory Committee. (Barngarlidhi Manoo – Part II)
Zuckermann, Ghil'ad, Emma Richards and the Barngarla (2021), Mangiri Yarda (Healthy Country: Barngarla Wellbeing and Nature), Revivalistics Press.

Scholarly articles 
Zuckermann, Ghil‘ad, Shakuto-Neoh, Shiori & Quer, Giovanni Matteo, 2014, Native Tongue Title: Proposed Compensation for the Loss of Aboriginal Languages, Australian Aboriginal Studies 2014/1: 55-71.
Zuckermann, Ghil‘ad & Walsh, Michael, 2014, 'Our Ancestors Are Happy!': Revivalistics in the Service of Indigenous Wellbeing, Foundation for Endangered Languages XVIII: 113-119.

Media items 
 Language lost and regained / Barngarla man Stephen Atkinson, THE AUSTRALIAN, 20 September 2013
 Dr Anna Goldsworthy on the Barngarla language reclamation / The Monthly, September 2014
 Barngarla language reclamation, Port Augusta
 Barngarla language reclamation, Port Lincoln
 Reawakening Language (including Barngarla sentences uttered by revivalist Professor Ghil'ad Zuckermann)
 Waking up Australia's sleeping beauty languages
 Hope for revival of dormant indigenous languages
 Reclaiming their language / Port Lincoln
 Awakening the "sleeping beauties" of Aboriginal languages 
 Cultural historical event begins / Whyalla
 Barngarla language app, Transcontinental, 2 August 2016
 Group moves to preserve Barngarla language / Port Augusta
 Calls for compensation over 'stolen' Indigenous languages
 Language revival could have mental health benefits for Aboriginal communities
 Australia’s Unspeakable Aboriginal Tragedy / Lainie Anderson, 6 May 2012
 Language More Important than Land

References

External links
 BARNGARLA: PEOPLE, LANGUAGE & LAND
 An interview with Stolen Generation Barngarla man Howard Richards and his wife Isabel / Port Lincoln
 Bibliography of Parnkalla language and people resources, at the Australian Institute of Aboriginal and Torres Strait Islander Studies

Thura-Yura languages
Language revival
Extinct languages of South Australia
Reconstructed languages
Eyre Peninsula